Centro Médico is a rapid transit station in San Juan metropolitan area, Puerto Rico. It is located between San Francisco and Cupey stations on the only line of the Tren Urbano system, in the Monacillo Urbano and Gobernador Piñero districts of the city of San Juan. The station is named after the Rio Piedras Medical Center (Spanish: Centro Medico de Rio Piedras) located nearby. The trial service ran in 2004, however, the regular service only started on 6 June 2005.

Nearby 
 Hospital de Veteranos (VA Caribbean Healthcare System Hospital)
 Rio Piedras Medical Center (Centro Medico de Rio Piedras)
 University of Puerto Rico, Medical Sciences Campus
Cementerio de la Capital Memorial Park

Gallery

References

Tren Urbano stations
Railway stations in the United States opened in 2004
2004 establishments in Puerto Rico